Lnozavod (lit. flax factory) is the name of several rural localities in Russia.

Modern localities
Lnozavod, Altai Krai, a settlement in Togulsky Selsoviet of Togulsky District in Altai Krai; 
Lnozavod, Kaluga Oblast, a selo in Iznoskovsky District of Kaluga Oblast
Lnozavod, Kiknursky District, Kirov Oblast, a settlement in Russko-Krainsky Rural Okrug of Kiknursky District in Kirov Oblast; 
Lnozavod, Luzsky District, Kirov Oblast, a village in Papulovsky Rural Okrug of Luzsky District in Kirov Oblast; 
Lnozavod, Shabalinsky District, Kirov Oblast, a settlement in Chernovsky Rural Okrug of Shabalinsky District in Kirov Oblast; 
Lnozavod, Mari El Republic, a settlement in Chuksolinsky Rural Okrug of Novotoryalsky District in the Mari El Republic; 
Lnozavod, Omsk Oblast, a settlement in Kurgansky Rural Okrug of Muromtsevsky District in Omsk Oblast
Lnozavod, Dukhovshchinsky District, Smolensk Oblast, a settlement under the administrative jurisdiction of Dukhovshchinskoye Urban Settlement in Dukhovshchinsky District of Smolensk Oblast
Lnozavod, Muryginskoye Rural Settlement, Pochinkovsky District, Smolensk Oblast, a village in Muryginskoye Rural Settlement of Pochinkovsky District in Smolensk Oblast
Lnozavod, Shatalovskoye Rural Settlement, Pochinkovsky District, Smolensk Oblast, a village in Shatalovskoye Rural Settlement of Pochinkovsky District in Smolensk Oblast
Lnozavod, Stodolishchenskoye Rural Settlement, Pochinkovsky District, Smolensk Oblast, a village in Stodolishchenskoye Rural Settlement of Pochinkovsky District in Smolensk Oblast
Lnozavod, Ugransky District, Smolensk Oblast, a village in Veshkovskoye Rural Settlement of Ugransky District in Smolensk Oblast
Lnozavod, Vologda Oblast, a settlement in Minkovsky Selsoviet of Babushkinsky District in Vologda Oblast

Alternative names
Lnozavod, alternative name of Borovskoy, a settlement in Shangskoye Settlement of Sharyinsky District in Kostroma Oblast; 
Lnozavod, alternative name of Lnozavoda, a settlement in Soligalichskoye Settlement of Soligalichsky District in Kostroma Oblast; 
Lnozavod, alternative name of Mirny, a settlement in Sudislavskoye Settlement of Sudislavsky District in Kostroma Oblast;